The 1951 Georgia Tech Yellow Jackets football team represented the Georgia Tech Yellow Jackets of the Georgia Institute of Technology during the 1951 college football season. The team was named national champion by Berryman and co-champion by Boand.

Schedule

References

Georgia Tech
Georgia Tech Yellow Jackets football seasons
Southeastern Conference football champion seasons
Orange Bowl champion seasons
Georgia Tech Yellow Jackets football